Count Alfred Wojciech Potocki hr. Piława (1785–1862) was a Polish nobleman (szlachcic), landowner, political and economic activist.

Alfred was the 1st Ordynat of Łańcut estates. From 1809 until 1815 he served in the Polish Army. In 1812 he became aide-de-camp of Prince Józef Antoni Poniatowski and participated in Napoleon's campaign against Russia.

In 1838 he created the Łańcut Ordynacja. Since 1861 Alfred was member of the National Sejm in Galicia, and member of the Herrenhaus. He served as the Austrian councillor and was the Galician Great Ochmistrz.

Alfred helped to modernize the agriculture in Galicia. He founded textile (1839–1844) and sugar (1836–1841) factories. He was co-founder of the "Estate Credit Society" in Lwów. Since 1823 he ran the Lubomirski family distillery in Łańcut, which exists today under the name Polmos Łańcut.

His father was the writer Jan Potocki, best known for his famous novel The Manuscript Found in Saragossa. His brother was Count Artur Potocki (1787–1832), who married Countess Zofia Branicka.

Marriage and issue
Alfred Wojciech married Princess Józefina Maria Czartoryska on 21 June 1814 and had four children:

 Count Alfred Józef Potocki (1817 or 1822–1889), married Princess Maria Klementyna Sanguszko
 Countess Ewa Józefina Julia Potocka (1818–1895), married Prince Franz de Paula of Liechtenstein 
 Countess Zofia Ewa Potocka (1820–1882), married Count Moritz von Dietrichstein (1801–1852)

Bibliography
 Polski Słownik Biograficzny t. 27 s. 760

References

1785 births
1862 deaths
Counts of Poland
Polish Army officers
19th-century Polish businesspeople
19th-century Polish politicians
Alfred Wojciech Potocki
Members of the House of Lords (Austria)
Members of the Diet of Galicia and Lodomeria
Polish Austro-Hungarians
People of the Duchy of Warsaw
Polish military personnel of the Napoleonic Wars
19th-century Polish landowners
People from Łańcut
Polish expatriates in France
Polish industrialists
Austro-Hungarian businesspeople